Aleš Matějů (born 3 June 1996) is a Czech professional footballer who last played as a defender for  side Palermo and Czech Republic national team. He previously played for Příbram, Viktoria Plzeň, Brighton & Hove Albion, Brescia and Venezia, and has represented his country at all under-age levels.

Career

Příbram
Matějů made his career league debut for Příbram on 30 August 2014 in a 4–1 loss away to Slovácko in the Czech First League. He scored his first league goal in the 1–1 draw with Teplice on 17 May 2015 and finished the season with one goal in 15 league matches.

Viktoria Plzeň
Matějů moved to Viktoria Plzeň in 2015 and became an integral part of the squad, appearing in the starting eleven in 16 consecutive matches and helping Plzeň win the First League title and Czech Supercup in 2016. However, his status in the team was downgraded in the 2016–17 season as Radim Řezník took his place as the first-choice right back.

Brighton & Hove Albion
Matějů signed a three-year contract with English Premier League club Brighton & Hove Albion on 4 August 2017.

Brescia
He spent the 2018–19 season on loan to Italian club Brescia, helped them win the Serie B title and with it promotion to Serie A, and then signed a permanent contract for an undisclosed fee. On 1 January 2022, his contract with Brescia was terminated by mutual consent.

Venezia
On 10 February 2022, Matějů signed with Venezia until the end of the 2021–22 season, with an option to extend for two more years.

Palermo
On 26 August 2022, after having been released by Venezia, Matějů signed for Serie B club Palermo as a free transfer, reuniting with his former Brescia coach Eugenio Corini.

International career
Matějů represented the Czech Republic at all youth levels from under-16 to under-21.

He made his national team debut on 7 October 2020 in a friendly against Cyprus.

Career statistics

References

External links 
 
 Aleš Matějů official international statistics

1996 births
Living people
Sportspeople from Příbram
Czech footballers
Czech Republic youth international footballers
Czech Republic under-21 international footballers
Czech Republic international footballers
Association football defenders
1. FK Příbram players
PSV Eindhoven players
FC Viktoria Plzeň players
Brighton & Hove Albion F.C. players
Brescia Calcio players
Venezia F.C. players
Palermo F.C. players
Czech First League players
Serie A players
Serie B players
UEFA Euro 2020 players
Czech expatriate footballers
Expatriate footballers in the Netherlands
Expatriate footballers in England
Expatriate footballers in Italy